James Pickens Jr. (born October 26, 1954) is an American actor. He is best known for his starring role as Dr. Richard Webber on the ABC medical drama television series Grey's Anatomy, and for his supporting role as Deputy Director Alvin Kersh on later seasons of the Fox Network science fiction series The X-Files, and Chuck Mitchell on Roseanne (1990-1996;2018), and The Conners (2018–Present).

Early life and education
Pickens was born in Cleveland, Ohio. He began acting while a student at Bowling Green State University. His first acting role was in a campus production of Matters of Choice by Chuck Gordone. Pickens earned his Bachelor of Fine Arts degree from BGSU in 1976.

Career 
Pickens started his professional acting career at the Roundabout Theatre in New York City playing Walter Lee in A Raisin in the Sun. In 1981, Pickens performed in the Negro Ensemble Company's production of A Soldier's Play, starring alongside Denzel Washington and Samuel L. Jackson.

In 1986, Pickens began his TV career playing Zack Edwards on the soap opera Another World from 1986 to 1990.  He went on to have recurring roles on "X-Files" as Deputy Director Kersh, Curb Your Enthusiasm, The West Wing, Roseanne, Beverly Hills, 90210, JAG, and Six Feet Under. He also served a role in 42. In 1997, Pickens played the role of Stevens, head of NASA, in Disney’s comedy Rocket Man. 
 
In 2002, Pickens had a cameo appearance as the male zoo doctor in the film Red Dragon.

In the February 28, 2007, all-star benefit reading of "The Gift of Peace" at UCLA's Freud Playhouse, he portrayed a man whose life experiences lead him to volunteer in the peace movement, and played alongside actors Ed Asner, Barbara Bain, Amy Brenneman, George Coe, and Wendie Malick. The play was an open appeal and fundraiser for passage of U.S. House Resolution 808, which sought to establish a Cabinet-level "Department of Peace" in the U.S. government, to be funded by a two-percent diversion of the Pentagon's annual budget.

In 2005, Pickens was chosen to play Dr. Richard Webber on the ABC medical drama Grey's Anatomy. In 2018, Pickens has reprised his role as Chuckie Mitchell in two episodes of the tenth season revival of Roseanne.

Personal life 
Pickens married Gina Taylor, a former member of Musique, on May 27, 1984 and has two children. In his spare time Pickens can be found horseback riding and roping cattle. He is a member of the United States Team Roping Championship and competes in roping events across the country. He owns an American Quarter Horse named Smokey.

James's two children, Carl Pickens and Gavyn Pickens, are both pursuing careers in show business. His son Carl is working on a Hip-Hop career and can be seen in various television appearances, including Hangin' with Mr. Cooper where he appeared alongside his long-time friend Omar Gooding. His father James Pickens Sr. worked for the City of Cleveland.

Filmography

Film

Television

References

External links 

 

1954 births
Male actors from Cleveland
American male film actors
African-American male actors
American male television actors
Bowling Green State University alumni
Living people
20th-century American male actors
21st-century American male actors
Roping (rodeo)
20th-century African-American people
21st-century African-American people